Arlie Franklin Culp (April 9, 1926 – October 18, 2017) was a Republican member of the North Carolina General Assembly, United States, for nine terms. He represented the state's sixty-seventh House district, including constituents in Randolph county.  A retiree from Ramseur, North Carolina, Culp retired from the state House in 2006. He died on October 18, 2017.

Recent electoral history

2004

2002

2000

References

External links

|-

|-

1926 births
2017 deaths
People from Stanly County, North Carolina
People from Randolph County, North Carolina
Democratic Party members of the North Carolina House of Representatives
20th-century American politicians
21st-century American politicians